He Jianguo (Chinese: 何建国 born 1951) is a contemporary Chinese idiosyncratic and self-taught calligraphy artist. He Jianguo is regarded as a twentieth-century artist who is continuing the literati tradition. His brushstrokes and calligraphy are unorthodox. He Jianguo draws on traditional subjects with his own interpretation, depicting Beijing scenes.

He Jianguo is inspired by the works of Matisse, Picasso, Cézanne and Kandinsky. He is conservative, irrespective of his work, but he's not part of the ‘avant-garde’ rather one of the ink painters who are working creatively with what in lesser hands is a stultifying tradition.

Bibliography

Paintings
Collection of He Jianguo

Publications

References

External links
 He Jianguo's Website

Living people
People's Republic of China painters
1951 births
People's Republic of China writers
Chinese non-fiction writers